Alberto Ruschel (21 February 1918 – 18 January 1996) was a Brazilian actor, producer, and director. He appeared in more than 30 films between 1947 and 1981.

Selected filmography
 O Cangaceiro (1953)
 Pride (1955)
 Cara de Fogo (1957)
 A Morte Comanda o Cangaço (1961)
 Aconcagua (1964)
 The Palace of Angels (1970)

External links

1918 births
1996 deaths
Brazilian male film actors
People from Rio Grande do Sul
20th-century Brazilian male actors